PYG (Pyg) was a short-lived "supergroup" from Japan, made up of members of well-known bands of the Group Sounds era: The Tempters, The Spiders and The Tigers. The spelling of "Pyg" (rather than "Pig", which was the band's original choice) was suggested by Alan Merrill, who shared the same management at the time, Watanabe Productions.

Formed in 1971, the unit was fronted by two notable musicians of the era: lead singers Kenji Sawada of The Tigers and Kenichi Hagiwara of The Tempters. The musical director of the band was guitarist Takayuki Inouye of The Spiders. The remaining members were Katsuo Ohno on keyboards, Hiroshi Oguchi on drums, and Ittoku "Sally" Kishibe on bass. Session man Yuji Harada, a non "Group Sounds" star, was also added to the line-up as a second drummer. The band were a seven piece ensemble on stage.

The band released two albums: Original First Album (1971) and Free With Pyg (1972 live 2 album set); as well as 5 singles.

References

Japanese rock music groups
Musical groups established in 1971

zh:澤田研二